Committed is a Canadian adult animated sitcom that aired on CTV in Canada in 2001, and WE: Women's Entertainment in the U.S. in 2002, based on the U.S. comic strip of the same name by Michael Fry, better known for Over the Hedge.

Content
The show is based on the comic strip of the same name. It features father Joe Larsen, his wife Liz, their children, Tracy, Zelda, and Nicholas; and their pet dog, Bob. The show's comedy focuses on the parents' attempts to balance their careers and personal lives while raising their children. Interludes of the cartoon feature Bob acting as a Greek chorus. Bob also breaks the fourth wall throughout the series.

The show features celebrity voice talents such as Eugene Levy as Joe Larsen, Catherine O' Hara as Liz Larsen, Andrea Martin as Frances Wilder, and Dave Foley as Bob the Dog.

Cast 
 Eugene Levy as Joe Larsen
 Catherine O'Hara as Liz Larsen
 Andrea Martin as Frances Wilder
 Dave Foley as Bob the Dog
 Annick Obonsawin as Tracy Larsen
 Charlotte Arnold as Zelda Larsen
 Cole Caplan as Nicholas Larsen
 Oscar Hsu as Gary Wong
 Ron Pardo as Cal
 Linda Kash as Val
 Len Carlson as Additional Voices
 Greg Spottiswood as Additional Voices
 Adrian Truss as Additional Voices

Episodes

Critical reception
Lynne Heffley of The Los Angeles Times gave the show a mostly-negative review, stating that "Not even the show's few moments of genuinely resonant parental reality can overcome forced plotlines".

References

External links 

 

2000s Canadian adult animated television series
2000s Canadian sitcoms
2001 Canadian television series debuts
2001 Canadian television series endings
Canadian adult animated comedy television series
Canadian animated sitcoms
English-language television shows
CTV Television Network original programming
Television series by Bell Media
Television series by Nelvana
Animated television series about dysfunctional families
Television shows based on comic strips